Crusty Bunker, or the Crusty Bunkers, was the collective pseudonym of a group of comic book inkers clustered around Neal Adams' and Dick Giordano's New York City-based art and design agency Continuity Studios from 1972 to 1977. The group was also occasionally credited as Ilya Hunch, Chuck Bunker, or The Goon Squad. Many Crusty Bunkers team members went on to successful individual careers in the comics industry.

History 
According to former member Alan Weiss, the name "Crusty Bunker" was first coined by Adams in relation to his children: "It was like calling someone a name that wasn't really dirty. ... It didn't really mean anything, it just sounded good".

There were over 60 artists who at one time or another were Crusty Bunker members. The core group consisted of artists who rented space at Continuity or worked up front in the advertising studio itself. Continuity would get the assignment, someone with experience (usually Adams or Giordano) would ink the faces and main figures, then pass it around for everyone to work on it, until the whole thing was completed. Comic book titles that the collective worked on included Marvel's Red Sonja and Marvel Premiere, the Marvel black-and-white magazine titles Dracula Lives!, Tales of the Zombie, and Monsters Unleashed; and DC's Sword of Sorcery.

Former Crusty Bunker Larry Hama recounted: "If a job was incredibly late, then the Crusty Bunkers would gather together half-a-dozen to a dozen inkers and... turn out a whole book in a day or two, all under the supervision of Neal [Adams]. It was a whirl. Guys would be passing pages back and forth. Guys would be standing over boards filling in blacks upside down while somebody was rendering a face at the bottom of the page".

This period was one of transition in the comics industry, as DC Comics had been toppled from comics dominance by Marvel Comics. In an attempt to revitalize its brand, DC made a concerted effort to entice young artists, including from this talent pool. As many of the Crusty Bunkers began getting regular comics work, they discontinued working in the group's collaborative fashion. The collective was effectively disbanded in 1977, although Adams resurrected the name for some of the comics put out by his own publishing company, Continuity Comics, from 1985 to 1993.

Art style 
Although directed (and often worked on directly) by Adams, the Crusty Bunkers inking style was not a clone of Adams' individual work. Their early published work showed a herky-jerky, jumble of styles that revealed the work of multiple hands. Within about a year, however (in response to the demand from publishers for a homogenous look), the Crusty Bunkers had developed a true "house style", with only hints of the individual styles that the respective artists later became known for. This house style was more rough-hewn than similar work by Adams.

Members included
Source:

Neal Adams – principal
Dick Giordano – principal
Jack Abel
Vicente Alcazar
Sal Amendola
Steven Austin
Terry Austin
Joe Barney
Rick Basile
Pat Bastienne
Pat Broderick
Joe Brozowski [per Bails] or Joe Brosowski 
Frank Brunner
Rick Bryant
Rich Buckler
Howard Chaykin
Frank Cirocco
Dave Cockrum
Denys Cowan
Joe D'Esposito
Ed Davis
Karin Dougherty
Steve Englehart
John Fuller
Dan Green 
Darrell Goza
Larry Hama
Steve Harper
Russ Heath
Klaus Janson
Jeffrey Catherine Jones
Paul Kirchner
Alan Kupperberg
Carl Lundgren
Esteban Maroto
Gary Martin
Bob McLeod
Al Milgrom
Steve Mitchell
Yong Montano
Tim Moriarty
Gray Morrow
Michael Netzer (Nasser)
Bruce Patterson
Carl Potts
Ralph Reese
Mark Rice
Marshall Rogers
Josef Rubinstein
James Sherman
Mary Skrenes
Bob Smith
Jim Starlin
Greg Theakston
Trevor Von Eeden
Alan Weiss
Bob Wiacek
Gary Winnick
Berni Wrightson

Bibliography 
Source unless otherwise noted:

1970s incarnation

Atlas/Seaboard 
Wulf the Barbarian #2 (1975)

Charlton 
Emergency! (1976)
Six Million Dollar Man (1976)

DC 
Mr. Miracle (1977)
Sword of Sorcery #1–2 (1973)
Weird Worlds #2–3 (1972–73), credited as "C. Bunker"

Marvel 
Conan the Barbarian #44–45, Annual #3 (1974–77)
Crazy Magazine #2 (1974)
Deadly Hands of Kung-Fu Special Album #1 (1974)
Doctor Strange #4 (1974) – uncredited
Dracula Lives #3, 10, Annual #1 (Curtis/Marvel, 1973–1975)
Haunt of Horror #4 (1974)
Iron Man #91 (1976)
Ka-Zar (1974–75)
Marvel Premiere #10, 12–13 (1973–74)
Marvel Preview #1 (1975)
Marvel Treasury Edition #6 (1975)
Monsters Unleashed #3, Annual #1 (1973–75)
Power Man #31 (1976)
Savage Sword of Conan #2–3 (1974)
Savage Tales #7, 10 (1974–75)

1980s and 1990s

Continuity
Armor #1 (1985)
The Basics (1985)
Hybrids: The Origin #4–5 (1993)
Ms. Mystic #5 (1990)
Ms. Mystic (vol. 2) #1, 3 (1993)
Revengers Featuring Armor and Silver Streak #1 (1985)
Urth 4 (1989–1993)

See also 
 Harry "A" Chesler
 Eisner & Iger
 Funnies Inc.

References

External links
 Netzer, Michael. The Lives and Time of Crusty Bunker, Michael Netzer Online, September 17, 2007
 Rozakis, Bob. You Too Can Be the Answer Man, Comics Bulletin, April 23, 2001
 Crusty Bunkers at the Comic Book DB

American comics artists
Collective pseudonyms
Comics groups and collectives
Comics inkers
Continuity Comics